Paul Clemens (born 1973 in Detroit) is an American non-fiction writer and journalist.

Life
He was born and grew up in Detroit, which has become the subject matter for much of his work. His books include the memoir Made in Detroit and Punching Out, a book of long-form journalism about the closing of a Detroit auto plant. His work has also appeared in The New York Times.

Works
Made in Detroit, Doubleday, 2005
Punching Out, Doubleday, 2011

Awards
2008 Guggenheim Fellowship
2011 Whiting Award

References

External links
Profile at The Whiting Foundation

American non-fiction writers
Living people
Writers from Detroit
1973 births